Erebia fletcheri  is a  butterfly found in the East  Palearctic (Altai to  Northeast Yakutia, Sayan, Transbaikalia. Amur) that belongs to the browns family. It resembles Erebia dabanensis but  in fletcheri the reddish yellow borders of the ocelli of the forewing are merged on both sides to form a broad russet band. On the hindwing the small ocelli are widely separated from one another. The median band on the underside of the hindwing is dark and somewhat prominent in, while in fletcheri it is of the same dark brown colour as the rest of the wing, so that only the edges of this band are visible as two finely dentate black curved lines. It is found in July between Kurai and Bashkaus.

See also
List of butterflies of Russia

References

External links
 Images representing Erebia iranica at Barcodes of Life

Satyrinae